Douglas Jamieson (14 April 1880 – 31 May 1952) was a Scottish Unionist politician and judge.

Biography 
Jamieson was born on 14 April 1880 to Violet and William Jamieson, a merchant. Educated at Cargilfield School, Fettes College, the University of Glasgow and the University of Edinburgh, He was admitted as an advocate in 1911 and became a King's Counsel in 1926.

Jamieson was an unsuccessful candidate for Stirling and Falkirk in 1929 and was elected for Glasgow Maryhill in October 1931, holding the seat until his retirement in 1935. He was Solicitor General for Scotland from October 1933 until March 1935, and Lord Advocate from March to October 1935. He was appointed a Privy Counsellor in May 1935.

On his resignation, he was appointed in November 1935 to the bench of the Court of Session, with the judicial title Lord Jamieson, replacing Lord Blackburn. He held this post until his death in 1952 aged 72.

References 

1880 births
1952 deaths
Members of the Parliament of the United Kingdom for Scottish constituencies
Unionist Party (Scotland) MPs
UK MPs 1931–1935
Lord Advocates
People educated at Cargilfield School
People educated at Fettes College
Alumni of the University of Edinburgh
Solicitors General for Scotland
Jamieson
Members of the Privy Council of the United Kingdom
Members of the Faculty of Advocates
Scottish King's Counsel
20th-century King's Counsel
Maryhill